USS Wake (PR-3)  was a United States Navy river gunboat operating on the Yangtze River. Originally commissioned as the gunboat Guam (PG-43), she was redesignated river patrol vessel PR-3 in 1928, and renamed Wake  23 January 1941. She was captured by Japan on 8 December 1941 and renamed Tatara. After her recapture in 1945, she was transferred to Chinese nationalists, who renamed her Tai Yuan. Communist forces captured her in 1949. On 1 May, 1949 Tai Yuan was sunk by Nationalist aircraft in the Caishiji River.

Service history

U.S. Navy
She was launched on 28 May 1927 as Guam by the Kiangnan Dock and Engineering Works in Shanghai, China, and commissioned on 28 December 1927. Her primary mission was to ensure the safety of American missionaries and other foreigners. Later, the ship also functioned as a "radio spy ship," keeping track of Japanese movements. However, by 1939, she was "escorted" by a Japanese warship wherever she went, as China fell more and more under Imperial Japanese control.

On 23 January 1941, she was renamed Wake, as Guam was to be the new name of a large cruiser being built in the U.S. 
On 25 November 1941, LCDR Andrew Earl Harris, the brother of Field Harris, was ordered to close the Navy installation at Hankow, and sail to Shanghai. On 28 November 1941, LCDR Harris and most of the crew were transferred to gunboats and ordered to sail to the Philippines. Columbus Darwin Smith—an old China hand who had been piloting river boats on the Yangtze River—was asked to accept a commission in the U.S. Navy and was appointed captain of Wake with the rank of Lt. Commander.

When Pearl Harbor was attacked on 7 December 1941, Shanghai had been under Japanese occupation since the 1937 Battle of Shanghai. Smith was in command on 8 December 1941 (7 December in Hawaii), with a crew of 14, when the Japanese captured the ship, which was tied up at a pier in Shanghai. Smith had received a telephone call the night before from a Japanese officer he knew. The officer asked where Smith would be the next morning as he wanted to deliver some turkeys for Smith and his crew. The Japanese did the same to other American officers and officials so as to determine where they would be on 8 December. However, Commander Smith received word from his quartermaster about the Pearl Harbor attack and rushed to the ship only to find it under guard by the Japanese. Surrounded by an overwhelming Japanese force, the crew attempted unsuccessfully to scuttle the craft. Wake surrendered, the only U.S. ship to do so in World War II.

Commander Smith and his crew were confined to a prison camp near Shanghai, where the U.S. Marines and sailors captured on Wake Island were also later imprisoned.

Japanese service
The Japanese gave Wake to their puppet Wang Jingwei regime in Nanjing, where she was renamed . The following activities are known to have occurred during the war.

Post-war
In 1945, at the end of the war, she was recaptured by the U.S. The U.S. gave the ship to the Chinese nationalists, who renamed her Tai Yuan (太原). Finally, the ship was captured by Communist Chinese forces in 1949. On 1 May, 1949 Tai Yuan was sunk by Nationalist aircraft in the Caishiji River.

As of 2019, no other ship of the U.S. Navy has been named Wake, though a  launched in 1943 was named .

Awards

 Yangtze Service Medal
 China Service Medal
 American Defense Service Medal with "FLEET" clasp
 Asiatic–Pacific Campaign Medal with one battle star
 World War II Victory Medal

Footnotes

References
 
 Groom, Winston. 2005. 1942: The Year that Tried Men's Souls. Atlanta Monthly Press, New York.

External links

 navsource.org: USS Wake (PR-3)
 USS "Wake" as "IJN Tatara" and "RCS Tai Yuan".

Gunboats of the United States Navy
Ships built in China
1927 ships
Second Sino-Japanese War naval ships
World War II patrol vessels of the United States
Naval ships of the United States captured by Japan during World War II
Ships of the Reorganized National Government of China Navy
World War II patrol vessels of Japan
Patrol vessels of the Republic of China Navy
Patrol vessels of the People's Liberation Army Navy
Riverine warfare
Gunboats of the Imperial Japanese Navy